The Lost Trail is a 1945 American Western film directed by Lambert Hillyer and written by Adele Buffington. This is the seventeenth film in the "Marshal Nevada Jack McKenzie" series, and stars Johnny Mack Brown as Jack McKenzie and Raymond Hatton as his sidekick Sandy Hopkins, with Jennifer Holt, Riley Hill, Kenneth MacDonald and Eddie Parker. The film was released on October 20, 1945, by Monogram Pictures.

Cast           
Johnny Mack Brown as Nevada Jack McKenzie
Raymond Hatton as Sandy Hopkins / Trigger
Jennifer Holt as Jane Burns
Riley Hill as Ned Turner
Kenneth MacDonald as John Corbett
Eddie Parker as Bill 
John Ince as Bailey 
Frank LaRue as Jones
Steve Clark as Mason
Milburn Morante as Zeke 
Lynton Brent as Hall 
Frank McCarroll as Joe
Dick Dickinson as Ed
Henry Vroom as Tom

References

External links

American Western (genre) films
1945 Western (genre) films
Monogram Pictures films
Films directed by Lambert Hillyer
American black-and-white films
1940s American films
1940s English-language films